La Vitréenne Football Club is a French football club which was founded in 1973. The club is based in Vitré, Ille-et-Vilaine, Brittany. The club currently plays in the Championnat de France Amateurs Group D, the fourth tier of the French football league system.

Current squad
As of 12 April 2011.

Staff
Management

President:
 Pierric Bernard Herve

General Manager:
 Hervè Vite

Director of Sport
 Jean-Christophe Froc

Sports:

Head Coach
 Ludovic Huchede

Assistant Coach:
 Oswald Tanchot

Medical

Physio:
 Grégory Gaillard
 Josué Sole

Osteopathe:
 Richard Marchand

Reserve squad
 The team played in the DH Bretagne.

External links
Official Site
Official Forum

Association football clubs established in 1973
1973 establishments in France
Vitré, Ille-et-Vilaine
Sport in Ille-et-Vilaine
Football clubs in Brittany